The 1995 Cal State Northridge Matadors football team represented California State University, Northridge as a member of the  American West Conference (AWC) during the 1995 NCAA Division I-AA football season. Led by first-year head coach Dave Baldwin, Cal State Northridge compiled an overall record of 2–8 with a mark of 1–3 in conference play, placing third in the AWC. The team was outscored by its opponents 355 to 159 for the season. The Matadors played home games at North Campus Stadium in Northridge, California.

Schedule

References

Cal State Northridge
Cal State Northridge Matadors football seasons
Cal State Northridge Matadors football